Bubnovsky is a rural locality (a khutor) and the administrative center of Bubnovskoye Rural Settlement, Uryupinsky District, Volgograd Oblast, Russia. The population was 1,029 as of 2010. There are 18 streets.

Geography 
Bubnovsky is located in forest steppe, 30 km northwest of Uryupinsk (the district's administrative centre) by road. Mikhaylovskaya is the nearest rural locality.

References 

Rural localities in Uryupinsky District